Charles Stratton may refer to:

 Charles C. Stratton (1796–1859), governor of New Jersey, 1845–1848
 General Tom Thumb (Charles Sherwood Stratton, 1838–1883), circus performer for P. T. Barnum
 Charlie Stratton, film director